Prince Ludovico Spada Veralli Potenziani (19 August 1880 – 8 August 1971) was an Italian nobleman. He was born in Rieti. He was the 2nd fascist governor of Rome (1926–1928). He served in the Senate of the Kingdom of Italy. He died in Rome, Italy.

In 1928 he had the honour of a ticker-tape parade in New York.

References

External links
 

1880 births
1971 deaths
Mayors of Rome
Recipients of the Order of Saints Maurice and Lazarus
Members of the Senate of the Kingdom of Italy